The Littoral Rainforests of New South Wales is a group of fragmented and endangered ecological communities found by the coast in eastern Australia. Much of this seaside form has been destroyed by mining, tourist development or housing. It is threatened by extinction in the near future.  90% of the 433 sites are less than ten hectares in size. Littoral rainforest amounts to 0.6% of the rainforests in New South Wales.

The littoral rainforests of Australia extends from North Queensland to Victoria and many offshore islands, with a minority found within New South Wales.

Description and location 
Usually seen within 2 kilometres of the coast, from Mimosa Rocks National Park in the south to the border with the state of Queensland. the forest has a closed canopy of around 70% shade. Trees may be up to 30 metres tall in sheltered sites. But it is more often seen 5 to 15 metres tall. This forest type has been considered a form of sub-tropical rainforest, as only a few rainforest species are restricted to littoral sites.

Plant species 

Plants often have thick and leathery leaves, as a protection against sea winds. Vines are common. Tree species are often from the following botanical families: Myrtaceae, Lauraceae, Sapindaceae, Euphorbiaceae, Moraceae, & Rutaceae. Salt tolerant species such as Plum Pine, Tuckeroo, Red Fruited Olive Plum, Black Apple, Mock Olive and Bolwarra are often encountered.  Endangered species include the Coast Fontainea and the Scented Acronychia. Ferns are less often seen than in nearby sub-tropical rainforests. Non rainforest species are occasionally seen in these forests, such as the Coast Banksia (Banksia integrifolia) and Bangalay (Eucalyptus botryoides).

Environmental factors 
The rainforest grows on beach sand, quartz-rich sediments, meta-sediments or on coastal headlands enriched by volcanic minerals. Sea winds add fertility to the sandy soils, with air borne minerals such as calcium, magnesium, potassium and phosphorus. Relative humidity is high, and the climate is equable with higher minimum temperatures than further inland. Rainfall is generally over one metre per year. Salt scalding from the sea winds often produces an even and dense canopy. Weeds are a threat to the remaining areas. Biting insects and ticks, dense foliage and a variety of reptiles has not endeared this habitat to modern humans.

Examples 

Examples of this rainforest type may be found from as far south as Mimosa Rocks National Park, Seven Mile Beach, Burning Palms and Barrenjoey. Further north it is preserved at sites such as Sea Acres National Park, Broken Head Nature Reserve, and Brunswick Heads Nature Reserve. The largest littoral rainforest in NSW is at Iluka Nature Reserve which is part of the World Heritage Site Gondwana Rainforests of Australia inscribed in 1986 and added to the Australian National Heritage List in 2007.

References 

 

Geography of New South Wales
Forests of New South Wales
Endangered ecological communities